Swords of the Swashbucklers first appeared in the Marvel Graphic Novel range. Epic Comics, a division of Marvel Comics, began publishing it as a twelve-issue limited series between March 1985 and March 1987. The series was created by Bill Mantlo and Jackson Guice.

Publication history

Plot synopsis
Swords of the Swashbucklers is set in an alternate dimension to Earth in which the inhabitants resemble Earth's pirates of old. A powerful, evil race of aliens known as the Colonizers controls the dimension while rebel "Swashbucklers" rob and pillage their oppressors so that they might survive. In one battle, The Admiral of the Colonizers' armada, J'Rel discovers Earth and kidnaps two humans. The couple's daughter, Domino Blackthorne Drake, finds the "Swashbucklers" and agrees to use her unique powers to fight the Colonizers if the Pirate Queen, Captain Raader, and her crew should help her to rescue her parents. The series chronicles the ensuing battles and the adventures of the "Swashbucklers" and their two charismatic female leaders.

Collected editions
In 2017, Dynamite Entertainment announced plans to publish a complete collection of the original graphic novel and twelve-issue series, partly funded by a Kickstarter campaign.

Notes

References

External links
 Full First Issue: Mantlo & Guice's SWORDS OF THE SWASHBUCKLER, Newsarama, March 6, 2018
 Swords of the Swashbucklers, Marvel Database wikia

1984 graphic novels
1985 comics debuts
Characters created by Bill Mantlo
Characters created by Jackson Guice
Epic Comics titles
Marvel Comics graphic novels
Pirate comics